Tuba City Airport  is a public-use airport located  west of the central business district of Tuba City, in Coconino County, Arizona, United States. It is owned by the Navajo Nation.

This is one of six airports owned by the Navajo Nation; the other five being Chinle Airport (E91), Kayenta Airport (0V7) and Window Rock Airport (RQE) in Arizona, plus Crownpoint Airport (0E8) and Shiprock Airport (5V5) in New Mexico.

Facilities and aircraft 
It has one runway designated 15/33 with an asphalt surface measuring 6,230 by 75 feet (1,899 x 23 m). For the 12-month period ending April 18, 2010, the airport had 250 general aviation aircraft operations, an average of 20 per month.

References

External links 
 Tuba City Airport (T03) at Arizona DOT airport directory
 Tuba City Airport at Navajo Air Transportation Department
 Aerial image as of 4 July 1997 from USGS The National Map
 

Airports in Coconino County, Arizona
Navajo Nation airports